The 1997 Speedway Grand Prix of Poland was the fifth race of the 1997 Speedway Grand Prix season. It took place on 30 August in the Olympic Stadium in Wrocław, Poland It was the third Polish SGP and was won by American rider Greg Hancock. It was the third win of his career.

Starting positions draw 

The Speedway Grand Prix Commission nominated Rafał Dobrucki from Poland as Wild Card.

Heat details

The intermediate classification

See also 
 Speedway Grand Prix
 List of Speedway Grand Prix riders

References

External links 
 FIM-live.com
 SpeedwayWorld.tv

Speedway Grand Prix of Poland
P
1997
Sport in Wrocław